Java Kiwi Atlántico is a UCI Continental road bicycle racing team established in 2018. The team registered with the UCI for the 2019 season.

Team roster

Previous rosters

2019

2020

2021

National Champions
2019
 Cyprus Time Trial, Andreas Miltiadis
 Cyprus Road Race, Andreas Miltiadis
2020
 Cyprus Time Trial, Andreas Miltiadis
 Cyprus Road Race, Andreas Miltiadis
2021
 Cyprus Time Trial, Andreas Miltiadis
 Cyprus Road Race, Andreas Miltiadis
2022
 Cyprus Time Trial, Andreas Miltiadis
 Cyprus Road Race, Andreas Miltiadis

References

External links

Cycling teams established in 2018
UCI Continental Teams (Europe)
Cycling teams based in Spain